Sainte-Marguerite-sur-Duclair is a commune in the Seine-Maritime department in the Normandy region in northern France.

Geography

Heraldry

Population

Places of interest
 The church of St.Marguerite, dating from the sixteenth century.
 The manorhouse, dating from the sixteenth century.

People
Karin Viard, a French actress born in 1966, spent much of her childhood here.

See also
Communes of the Seine-Maritime department

References

Communes of Seine-Maritime